Most of the United States' 50 states have a state motto, as do the District of Columbia and 3 of its territories. A motto is a phrase intended to formally describe the general motivation or intention of an organization. State mottos can sometimes be found on state seals or state flags. Some states have officially designated a state motto by an act of the state legislature, whereas other states have the motto only as an element of their seals. The motto of the United States itself is In God We Trust, proclaimed by Congress and signed into law by President Dwight D. Eisenhower on July 30, 1956. The motto "" (Latin for 'out of many, one') was approved for use on the Great Seal of the United States in 1782, but was never adopted as the national motto through legislative action.

South Carolina has two official mottos, both which are in Latin. Kentucky, North Dakota, and Vermont also have two mottos, one in Latin and the other in English. All other states and territories have only one motto, except for Guam and the Northern Mariana Islands, which do not have any mottos. English and Latin are the most-used languages for state mottos, each used by 25 states and territories. Seven states and territories use another language, of which each language is only used once. Eight states and two territories have their mottos on their state quarter; thirty-eight states and four territories have their mottos on their state seals.

The dates given are, where possible, the earliest date that the motto was used in an official sense. Some state mottos are not official but are on the official state seal; in these cases the adoption date of the seal is given. The earliest use of a current motto is that of Puerto Rico, granted to the island by the Spanish in 1511.

State, federal district and territory mottos

See also

 List of national mottos
 List of U.S. state nicknames
 United States national motto

Notes

References

External links
Mottoes of the 50 States from Netstate.com
State mottos from State Symbols USA

United States
Mottos
Mottos